Acisoma attenboroughi, or Attenborough's pintail, is a species of dragonfly. It is a member of the genus Acisoma and was named after the naturalist Sir David Attenborough in honour of his 90th Birthday.

It is found only in Madagascar, but is "very common" there.

See also
 List of things named after David Attenborough and his works

References

External links
 BBC Earth Youtube announcing the name

Libellulidae
Insects described in 2016
Endemic fauna of Madagascar
Insects of Madagascar
David Attenborough